

References 

Cranial nerves